The Freedom 28 (sometimes called the Freedom 27 to disambiguate it from the Freedom 28 Cat Ketch) is an American sailboat, that was designed by Gary Mull and first built in 1986. The design is out of production.

Production
The boat was built by Tillotson Pearson in the United States for Freedom Yachts and first built in 1986.

Design
The Freedom 28 is a small recreational keelboat, built predominantly of fiberglass, with wood trim. It has a free-standing masthead sloop rig, with a "Bierig" jib, an internally-mounted spade-type rudder and a fixed fin keel. It displaces  and carries  of lead ballast.

See also
List of sailing boat types

References

Keelboats
1980s sailboat type designs
Sailing yachts
Sailboat type designs by Gary Mull
Sailboat types built by Pearson Yachts